Lyssomanes elegans is a species of spiders in the jumping spider family, Salticidae. It is found from Mexico to Brazil.

References

External links 
 Lyssomanes elegans at the World Spider Catalog

Salticidae
Spiders of Brazil
Spiders of Mexico
Spiders of South America
Spiders described in 1900